The 2008–09 Binghamton Bearcats men's basketball team represented Binghamton University during the 2008–09 NCAA Division I men's basketball season. The Bearcats, led by second-year head coach Kevin Broadus, played their home games at the Binghamton University Events Center in Vestal, New York as members of the America East Conference.

The team finished with a record of 23–9, which tied a school record for wins in a season, and finished tied for first in America East play with a 13–3 conference record. The Bearcats clinched a share of their first America East regular season title and earned the top seed in the America East tournament. The Bearcats defeated 9th–seeded Hartford and 4th–seeded New Hampshire, before punching their ticket to their first NCAA tournament by beating 6th–seed UMBC in front of a sold-out Events Center. The Bearcats were given the #15 seed in the East Region, where they were slated to face off against the 3–time national champion Duke. The game was nationally televised by CBS as the late night headliner, but the Bearcats historic season came to an end, as they lost 86–62. Head coach Kevin Broadus was named the conference's coach of the year for his efforts in the Bearcats run to the NCAA tournament.

Previous season 
In Kevin Broadus' first season as Binghamton head coach, the Bearcats showed signs of improvements that they previously had not under the leadership of Al Walker. The team finished 14–16, tied for fourth in the America East with a 9–7 conference record, a 3–game improvement from the previous season. The Bearcats earned the fifth seed in the 2009 America East men's basketball tournament, where they lost to fourth–seeded Vermont in the quarterfinals.

Roster 

}

Schedule 

|-
!colspan=12 style=|Non-conference regular season

|-
!colspan=12 style=|America East Regular Season

|-
!colspan=12 style=|America East tournament 

|-
!colspan=9 style=| NCAA tournament

References 

Binghamton Bearcats men's basketball seasons
Binghamton
Bingham Bear
Bingham Bear
Binghamton